The Fortuna–Oungre Border Crossing connects the towns of Fortuna, North Dakota and Oungre, Saskatchewan on the Canada–US border. It is located along the CanAm Highway: U.S. Route 85 on the American side and Saskatchewan Highway 35 on the Canadian side. It is the westernmost border crossing in the state of North Dakota.  It is a lightly-used crossing with the reduction in local population due to agricultural automation and the 1984 closure of the Fortuna Air Force Station.

The current US border station was built in 2004, and the Canada border station was built in 1978.  This crossing was established as a port of entry in 1930.

See also
 List of Canada–United States border crossings

References 

Canada–United States border crossings
Geography of Saskatchewan
1930 establishments in North Dakota
1930 establishments in Saskatchewan